Timothy Vincent Murphy (born 5 April 1960) is an Irish actor based in Los Angeles. His notable 2015 roles have been on The Bastard Executioner, Grace and Frankie, and True Detective. He played Galen O'Shea for three seasons on the Kurt Sutter FX series, Sons of Anarchy. For his portrayal, Murphy won the 2013 BuzzFocus Readers Choice Award for "Best Villain". He appeared for two seasons on NCIS: Los Angeles as Russian super-villain Sidorov, and a season on the CBS series, Criminal Minds as Emily Prentiss' nemesis/love interest, Ian Doyle. He has guest starred on such series as Hawaii Five-0, Revenge, Burn Notice, Shameless, Quantico,  24, Nip/Tuck, Alias, Six Feet Under, and Code Black.

Early life and education
Murphy was born Timothy Vincent Murphy in Tralee, County Kerry to Edward and Mary Murphy, one of six siblings. He began his career in Dublin, where he trained in the Focus Theater. He attended University College Cork, majoring in Law and Accounting. Murphy also spent time travelling in South Africa, working in construction and roof laying in the Bronx, New York City, and working in bars in Florida.

Career

Murphy's feature film credits include The Lone Ranger (2013); the action film parody MacGruber (2010), opposite Val Kilmer; Ed Harris' Western period drama Appaloosa (2008); the adventure thriller National Treasure: Book of Secrets (2007) and the horror thriller Shallow Ground (2004). In 2014, Murphy starred in Jason Momoa’s directorial debut, Road to Paloma; the Funk Brothers' film short Looms, which premiered at the Santa Barbara Film Festival; and the adventure drama Heaven's Floor, opposite Clea Duvall.

Murphy is also a stage actor and a Lifetime Member of the Actors Studio. His theatre credits include The Beauty Queen of Leenane at South Coast Rep, for which he garnered an Ovation Award nomination, and Coast Theater's The Lost Plays of Tennessee Williams, which won the LA Weekly "Best Ensemble" Award and for which he garnered an individual  "Best Performance" nomination.  He originated the role of Jake in the world premiere of Stones in his Pockets at the Tivoli Theater in Dublin, and he starred opposite Tyne Daly in a production of Agamemnon staged at the Getty Villa in Malibu, California. In August 2018, he started appearing in advertisements for British price-comparison site Confused.com.

Personal life
He is married to Caitlin Manley. On 22 July 2015, their first child, Seán Fionn Murphy, was born.

Selected filmography

 Glenroe (1995, TV Series) as Conor Sheehy (credited as Tim Murphy)
 The Doorman (1999) as Milo
 The District (2001, TV Series) as Martin McBride
 The Scary Side of Randall Coombe (2001)
 VIP (2001, TV Series) as General Volykov
 Six Feet Under (2002, TV Series) as Louis Winchell
 The Honorable (2002) as Milo
 It Could Happen (2002, Short) as Sammy Fingleton
 The Perfect Wife (2003) as Tim
 Fastlane (2003, TV Series) as Riley Morrison
 Murder, She Wrote: The Celtic Riddle (2003, TV Movie) as Inspector O'Dwyer
 Missing Brendan (2003) as Mark
 Paddy Takes a Meeting (2003, Short) as Paddy
 Alias (2003, TV Series) as Avery Russet (uncredited)
 Red Roses and Petrol (2003) as Eamonn
 Skeleton Man (2004, TV Movie) as Sgt. Terry
 Shallow Ground (2004) as Jack Sheppard
 Nip/Tuck (2004, TV Series) as Quinn
 Pit Fighter (2005) as Father Michael (credited as Tim Murphy)
 What's Up, Scarlet? (2005) as Vladamir Borshkoff (credited as Timothy Murphy)
 24 (2006, TV Series) as Schaeffer
 Manband the Movie (2007) as R.S. Smoothskin
 The Antique (2007, Short) as Tom
 National Treasure: Book of Secrets (2007) as Seth
 Gemini Division (2008, TV Series) as Agent A
 Beatrice (2008, Short) as Chris
 Green Street Hooligans 2 (2009, Video) as Max (credited as Timothy Murphy)
 The Butcher (2009) as Tyke (credited as Tim Murphy)
 CSI: NY (2010, TV Series) as Conner Wells
 The Sierra (2010, Short) as Bob
 MacGruber (2010) as Constantine Bach (credited as Tim Murphy)
 Madso's War (2010, TV Movie) as Kieran Graner
 Treasure of the Black Jaguar (2010) as Blake West
 Shameless (2011, TV Series) as Vlad
 Chuck (2011, TV Series) as Father of the Bride
 Bowman (2011, Short) as Bowman
 Criminal Minds (2011, TV Series) as Ian Doyle
 Amber Lake (2011) as Sergeant Eugene Stockard
 Take a Seat (2011, Short) as Reynold
 Noel Gallagher's High Flying Birds: If I Had a Gun (2011, Short) as Father of the Bride
 Sons of Anarchy (2011–2013, TV Series) as Galen O'Shay
 Fairly Legal (2012, TV Series) as Captain Maiken
 Not That Funny (2012) as Finneas Patrick O'Neill
 Longmire (2012) as Ephraim Hostetler
 Burn Notice (2012) as Vincent Durov
 Hell on Wheels (2012) as Bauer
 Lost Angeles (2012) as Cliff
 Dark Canyon (2012) as Warden Cullen Logan
 Revenge (2012) as Dmitri Bladoff
 NCIS: Los Angeles (2012–2013, TV Series) as Isaak Sidorov
 The Frankenstein Theory (2013) as Karl McCallion
 The Lone Ranger (2013) as Fritz
 To Hell with a Bullet (2003) as Dr. Nick Devyril
 Dystopia (2013, Short) as Marc
 Road to Paloma (2014) as FBI Agent Williams
 Hawaii Five-0 (2014, TV Series) as Nick "Valentine" Mercer
 Hot Bath an' a Stiff Drink (2014) as Dutch Winfield
 Grace and Frankie (2015, TV Series) as Byron
 How to Be a Gangster in America (2015) as Vlad
 True Detective (2015, TV Series) as Osip Agranov
 The Bastard Executioner (2015, TV Series) as Father Ruskin
 Scorpion (2016, TV Series) as Lithuanian Prime Minister
 No Way to Live (2016) as Detective Frank Giddins
 Heaven's Floor (2016) as Jack
 The Last Man on Earth (2017, TV Series) as Benjamin Brinton
 Tragedy Girls (2017) as Sheriff Blane Welch
 Anything (2017) as Isidore
 Westworld (2018, TV Series) as Coughlin
 The Ninth Passenger (2018) as Silas
 Quantico (2018, TV Series) as Conor Devlin
 Cuck (2019) as Bill
 In Full Bloom (2019) as Roane
 The Man in the High Castle (2019, TV Series) as SS-Oberst-Gruppenführer Adolf Eichmann
 Snowpiercer (2020-2021, TV Series) as Commander Grey
 Breach (2020) as Commander Stanley
 Hell Hath No Fury (2021) as Jerry
 Playing Through (2021) as James Grantham
 New Year (2021) as Ben
 S.W.A.T. (2021-22, TV Series) as Arthur Novak (three episodes)
 MacGruber (2021, TV Series) as Constantine Bach
 LA's Finest (2021) as Logan Kline
 American Siege (2022) as Charles Rutledge
 Detective Knight: Independence (2023)
 Law & Order: Organized Crime (2023–present)
 The Company You Keep (2023) as Maguire

References

External links
 

1960 births
Living people
Irish male film actors
Irish male television actors
Male actors from County Kerry
People from Tralee
20th-century Irish male actors
21st-century Irish male actors
Alumni of University College Cork
Irish expatriates in the United States